The Dovre Line is a Norwegian railway line with three slightly different lines which all lead to the historic city of Trondheim.

Definition
Dovre Line is the 484 km main line between Eidsvoll and Trondheim, used by Jernbaneverket since 2008.
Dovre Line is also the current name of the 548 km main line of the Norwegian railway system (Jernbaneverket) between Oslo and Trondheim, used when referring to the long-distance passenger trains.
Dovre Line was the name of the 209 km main line between Dombås and Trondheim until 2008.

The most inclusive of these meanings of Dovre Line thus includes the other two. To complicate the pattern even more, the first use of the Dovre Line was on the section between Dombås and Støren, completed in 1921. When this last section of the new standard gauge main line between Oslo and Trondheim via Lillehammer and Dombås was opened in 1921, the originally 49 km long narrow gauge section between Støren and Trondheim was made the northern part of the new Dovre Line. When talking about construction of railways  in Norway, Dovre Line is the 158,1 km long Dombås - Støren section.

Sections of the most inclusive use of Dovre Line (Dovrebanen)

General description and short history
The section south of Eidsvoll was until 1998 Norway's first public railway, Hovedbanen, from 1854, 68 km long. The present line between Oslo and Eidsvoll is the 4 km shorter  Gardermoen Line, the only high-speed line in the country. Hovedbanen is still in service for freight trains (and local commuters to Dal), but is not considered as a part of Dovre Line. The entire line from Oslo to Trondheim is 548 km today. It is a more heavily traveled line than the older Røros Line and electrification was completed 1 November 1970. Between 1935 and 1958, the Dovre Line was served by some of Norway's largest steam locomotives, the 2-8-4 NSB Class 49 "Dovregubben" ("Dovre Giant").

Compared to the Røros Line, the Dovre Line takes a more westerly course running through the town of Lillehammer and over the mountainous stretches of Dovre, before merging with the Røros Line again at Støren. There is one branch line, the Rauma Line which leaves the Dovre Line at Dombås.

To avoid the fairly regular river flooding on the railway line along the river Gaula, the Gulfoss Tunnel was completed in 1918 in the Hovin area of Melhus in what is now Trøndelag county.

Service 
The Norwegian State Railways used to be the sole operator of passenger services on the Dovre Line. Since June 2020, the service is operated by SJ Norge under the brand "SJ Nord". In each direction they are four express trains between Oslo and Trondheim, of which two daily departures with the tilting Class 73 units, offering travel times down to 6:37, with departures in the morning and afternoon. There is also a locomotive-hauled afternoon train and a night train with sleeper cars. In addition there is a morning service from Dombås to Oslo. At Dombås there is correspondence with Møre og Romsdal via the Rauma Line.

The southern part of the line has hourly departures with regional trains from Lillehammer to Oslo operated by Vy. In the northern end, the Dovre Line is served by the Trøndelag Commuter Rail.

Accidents 

The original Dovre Line was completed and officially opened on 17 September 1921. The inauguration ended on a tragic note when the train returning from the celebrations collided just after leaving Trondheim in the Nidareid train disaster the next day. The worst Norwegian railway disaster in peacetime also happened on the Dovre Line on 22 February 1975 when two trains collided one kilometer north of Tretten station, killing 27 people and wounding 25. There were approximately 800 people on the two trains.

Plans 
The government has plans for building double track on the section between Eidsvoll and Doknes and Minnesund–Kleverud–Steinsrud between 2010 and 2019, to increase the speed and capacity on the today very crowded section between Eidsvold and Hamar. There are also plans for new crossing sections and expand existing crossing sections to at least 600 meters. For a later introduction there are plans of double track all the way between Eidsvold and Lillehammer. The government has an ambition to do so by 2030.

References

External links 

 Dovre Line (Dovrebanen) NSB 
 Jernbaneverket's list of stations on the Dovre line

 
Railway lines in Innlandet
Railway lines in Trøndelag
Railway lines in Viken
Railway lines opened in 1921
Electric railways in Norway
1921 establishments in Norway